The 2021 Baden-Württemberg state election was held on 14 March 2021 to elect the 17th Landtag of Baden-Württemberg. The outgoing government was a coalition of Alliance 90/The Greens and the Christian Democratic Union (CDU) led by Minister-President Winfried Kretschmann.

The Greens remained the largest party with 32.6% of votes, an increase of two percentage points. Their junior coalition partner, the CDU, suffered its worst result in state history, falling to 24%. The opposition Social Democratic Party (SPD) also recorded a decline, but rose from fourth to third place. The Free Democratic Party (FDP) made small gains. Alternative for Germany (AfD) lost more than a third of their vote share and became the smallest party in the Landtag.

The CDU and SPD each recorded no net change in seats thanks to an increase in the size of the Landtag caused by a number of overhang seats won by the Greens. Overall, the governing coalition was returned with an increased majority, but an alternative coalition between the Greens, SPD, and FDP also won a majority; the Greens and SPD together fell one seat short of a majority. On 2 April, the Greens voted to enter negotiations with the CDU. The two parties finalised a coalition agreement on 1 May. Kretschmann was re-elected as Minister-President on 12 May.

Election date
The period of the 16th Landtag formally ends on 30 April 2021. The election of the 17th Landtag must take place before this date. On 24 March 2020, the state government designated 14 March 2021 as the date for the next election, in accordance with Section 19 of the State Parliament Election Act. A state election was held on the same day in neighbouring state of Rhineland-Palatinate.

Electoral system
The Landtag is elected via mixed-member proportional representation. 70 members are elected in single-member constituencies via first-past-the-post voting. 50 members are then allocated using compensatory proportional representation, distributed in each of Baden-Württemberg's four government districts. Unlike other states, Baden-Württemberg does not use party lists to fill proportional seats; instead, they are filled by the best-performing candidates who failed to be elected in the single-member constituencies. Candidates elected in this manner are listed as winning a "second mandate" (Zweitmandat) in the constituency in which they ran. The minimum size of the Landtag is 120 members, but if overhang seats are present, proportional leveling seats will be added to ensure proportionality. An electoral threshold of 5% of valid votes is applied to the Landtag; parties that fall below this threshold are excluded.

Background

In the previous election held on 13 March 2016, The Greens became the largest party for the first time in any German state, winning 30.3% of votes cast. The CDU lost 12 percentage points, falling to second place on 27.0%. Alternative for Germany contested their first state election in Baden-Württemberg, placing third with 15.1%. The Social Democratic Party (SPD) lost almost half its voteshare and finished with 12.7%. The Free Democratic Party (FDP) won 8.3%.

The Greens had led a coalition with the SPD since 2011, but this government lost its majority in the election. The Greens subsequently formed a coalition with the CDU, which took office as Cabinet Kretschmann II.

Parties
The table below lists the parties represented in the 16th Landtag.

In addition to the parties already represented in the Landtag, sixteen parties contested the election:

Campaign

Lead candidates
On 29 May 2019, state Minister for Education, Youth, and Sports Susanne Eisenmann was confirmed as the CDU's lead candidate for the election.

On 12 September 2019, Winfried Kretschmann stated that he would stand as the lead candidate for The Greens in the 2021 election, seeking a third term as Minister-President.

On 1 February 2020, state party leader Andreas Stoch was nominated as the SPD's lead candidate for the election.

On 8 December 2019, the FDP state executive nominated Hans-Ulrich Rülke as their preferred lead candidate for the election. He was formally selected at a party conference in July 2020. Rülke had served as leader of the FDP Landtag faction since 2009, and was the party's lead candidate in the 2016 election.

In August 2020, AfD parliamentary group leader Bernd Gögel advocated against the selection of a lead candidate for the election. He stated that due to the party's position and the state's unusual electoral system, the lead candidate might fall short of election to the Landtag. "If the top candidate missed entry, that would be embarrassing." In January 2021, Gögel defeated deputy parliamentary group leader Emil Sänze to become lead candidate after four rounds of voting in an online member survey.

On 6 December 2020, The Left nominated state spokeswoman Sahra Mirow as their lead candidate for the election.

Opinion polling

Graphical summary

Party polling

Minister-President polling

Preferred coalition

Results

Aftermath
The CDU suffered its worst ever result in the state, falling to 24%. Lead candidate Susanne Eisenmann, whose approval ratings as a minister were described by the Tagesschau as "moderate to bad", claimed responsibility for the poor result. However, factors such as disputes about the state government's response to the COVID-19 pandemic, and the "mask scandal" which broke a few days before the election, were cited as contributing factors.

Both the incumbent Green–CDU coalition and an alternative centre-left "traffic light coalition" of the Greens, SPD, and FDP garnered a majority, leading to speculation about a possible change in the governing arrangement. Combined with the successful re-election of a traffic light government in neighbouring Rhineland-Palatinate the same day, this sparked discussion about the arrangement nationally, including its viability on the federal level.

Government formation
After the election, Minister-President Kretschmann invited all parties except the AfD to exploratory talks, beginning with the CDU. This somewhat dampened speculation about a possible realignment of the governing coalition, though Kretschmann stated there was no special significance behind the decision to meet with the CDU first. On 2 April, the state Greens voted to enter negotiations with the CDU. The two parties finalised a coalition agreement on 1 May.

On 12 May, Kretschmann was elected as Minister-President for a third term by the Landtag. He won 95 votes with 55 against. The new ministry was sworn in the same day, comprising six Green and five CDU ministers.

See also
 2021 Rhineland-Palatinate state election

Notes

References

2021 elections in Germany
Elections in Baden-Württemberg
Opinion polling in Germany